Richard Gordon "Dick" Darman (May 10, 1943January 25, 2008) was an American businessman and government official who served in senior positions during the presidencies of Ronald Reagan and George H. W. Bush.

Early life
Darman was born in Charlotte, North Carolina, the son of Eleanor F. and Morton H. Darman. His father was a textile mill owner.

Darman graduated with honors from Harvard College in 1964 and from the Harvard Graduate School of Business Administration in 1967.

Career
Darman held several governmental positions under James Baker, including as Assistant Secretary of Commerce (1976–77). After the defeat of Gerald Ford, Darman became a member of the faculty of Harvard Kennedy School, to which he would return on two occasions between 1977 and 2002.

When Baker became White House Chief of Staff under President Reagan, Darman returned to serve as Assistant to the President of the United States and White House Staff Secretary (1981–85), before following Baker to the Treasury Department as Deputy Secretary of the Treasury (1985–87).

Darman served as Director of the Office of Management and Budget for the entire presidency of the first President Bush. Darman was regarded as provocative and intelligent by Washington insiders but was criticized by some economists for being too focused on the budget deficit and was sometimes blamed for convincing Bush to renege on his promise of "Read my lips: No new taxes," which is widely believed to have contributed to Bush's defeat in the election of 1992. Darman had previously tried to stop Bush from making the promise during the 1988 campaign.

From 1993 until his death in 2008, Darman was a partner and managing director of The Carlyle Group. During that period, Carlyle went from being a small firm with 26 employees to one of the world's largest and most successful private equity firms. Darman was a trustee of the Loomis Sayles Funds, the IXIS Funds, and the Howard Hughes Medical Institute. He served as Chairman of the Board of the Smithsonian National Museum of American History and, in May 2003, became Chairman of the Board of AES Corporation, an electric utility company.

Personal life
He married Kathleen Emmet on September 1, 1967; they had three sons, William T. E., Jonathan W. E. and C. T. Emmet Darman.

Darman died on January 25, 2008, at the age of 64, following a battle with acute myelogenous leukemia.

References

Further reading

External links

http://www.chron.com/disp/story.mpl/deaths/5487176.html
http://seattletimes.nwsource.com/html/nationworld/2004147668_darmanobit27.html
http://www.nndb.com/people/607/000056439/

|-

|-

1943 births
2008 deaths
American chief executives
Assistants to the President of the United States
Businesspeople from Charlotte, North Carolina
The Carlyle Group people
Deaths from cancer in Washington, D.C.
Deaths from acute myeloid leukemia
Directors of the Office of Management and Budget
George H. W. Bush administration cabinet members
Harvard Business School alumni
Harvard College alumni
Harvard Kennedy School faculty
Massachusetts Republicans
People from McLean, Virginia
United States Deputy Secretaries of the Treasury
Virginia Republicans
White House Staff Secretaries